The New Saints of Oswestry Town & Llansantffraid Football Club, also known as The New Saints or TNS, are a professional football club that currently play in the Cymru Premier. They are the most successful club in the Welsh league structure (which does not include Welsh teams playing in the English pyramid), with 15 league titles to their name. Since the 2001–02 season they have finished as champions or runners-up in every season apart from 2008 to 2009, where they finished third in the league.

History

Llansantffraid F.C. 
The club was formed as Llansantffraid F.C. to represent the border village of Llansantffraid-ym-Mechain (population: 1,000) in 1959, and played at the Recreation Ground.

They first tasted competitive football in the Montgomeryshire Amateur Football League (then the fourth level of the Welsh football league system), winning the championship seven times. At the end of the 1989–90 season they were elected to the Central Wales League (now the Mid-Wales League) but their stay was brief, winning promotion to the Cymru Alliance as runners-up on their first attempt. Llansantffraid's meteoric rise continued and in 1992–93 they gained promotion to the League of Wales, now the Cymru Premier, as champions and won the Welsh Intermediate Cup (formerly the Welsh Amateur Cup).

Total Network Solutions 
In 1996, Llansantffraid won the Welsh Cup and qualified for the first time for the European Cup Winners' Cup. At this time a local computer company, Total Network Solutions of Oswestry, arranged a £250,000 sponsorship deal which involved incorporating the company name into the club name. As Total Network Solutions Llansantffraid F.C. they met the Polish Cup winners Ruch Chorzów and earned a 1–1 draw at home before losing 5–0 in Poland. Since then they have qualified for European competition several times. The club's European home games are generally played at either Newtown's or Wrexham's stadium as their old Recreation Ground was far below UEFA's standards (though for their 2003 meeting with Manchester City, they played their home game at the 72,000-seat Millennium Stadium in Cardiff). To comply with UEFA's regulations on third-party sponsorship, the club were known by their initialism TNS by the European governing body in their competitions.

In 1997 the club's name was changed to Total Network Solutions F.C., being the first instance in the United Kingdom of a football club renaming itself after its sponsor's name only. Following the financial meltdown of Barry Town in the summer of 2003, TNS became the only Cymru Premier club which had a full-time playing staff. In the summer of 2005, however, Llanelli AFC also announced plans to go full-time.

Merger with Oswestry Town 
In the summer of 2003, the shareholders of Oswestry Town met to approve a merger with TNS, although not all the shareholders knew of the meeting. The financially weaker club was a close neighbour to TNS, and also played in the League of Wales despite being based across the border in Shropshire. The Football Association of Wales (FAW) ratified the merger on 14 August 2003 as did UEFA eventually, despite its initial objection to a merger of two clubs with different governing bodies.

The 2003–04 season was trophyless for TNS as they finished runners-up in the League of Wales to Rhyl and were beaten finalists in the Welsh Cup, also to Rhyl. The 2004–05 season proved much more successful, as TNS won a League and Cup double.

During the 2005–06 off-season, after newly crowned Champions League winners Liverpool were initially denied a place in the next season's competition, TNS offered to play a one-legged tie against the Reds for TNS's place in the first qualifying round. After UEFA reached a compromise by which Liverpool were placed in the first qualifying round of the competition, TNS and Liverpool ended up drawn against one another anyway. Liverpool won the first leg at Anfield 3–0 thanks to a Steven Gerrard hat-trick. In the second leg, played at Wrexham, Gerrard added two goals after coming on as a substitute to Djibril Cissé's opening tally for another 3–0 Liverpool victory. Although defeated, TNS drew praise, most notably for the young Northern Irish goalkeeper Gerard Doherty, of whom Rafael Benítez said, "The goalkeeper saved a lot of goals and for me he was the best player in the two games".

The New Saints F.C. 
In early 2006 the club's sponsor, Total Network Solutions, was taken over by British Telecom, as a result of which the sponsorship arrangement lapsed at the end of the 2005–06 season and it became necessary to find a new name for the club. After a trawl for new naming ideas, including an attempt to sell the naming rights on eBay, the name "The New Saints" was agreed upon as appropriate to the history of both of the originally merged clubs: Llansantffraid was always known as "The Saints"; Oswestry had strong connections with Saint Oswald; while the club's name was already abbreviated to "TNS". A new club badge was also developed at the same time, featuring a dragon to represent Llansantffraid and a lion representing Oswestry.

On 10 February 2010, the BBC reported that the New Saints had applied to play home games at Chester City's Deva Stadium in 2010–11, after having been turned down for a grant to help fund the construction of a new 1,000-seat stand at Park Hall. At the time, the mooted move was complicated by Chester City's governance issues. Deva Stadium's pitch and stands lie in Wales, but outbuildings on the site that housed the club offices are in England, and Chester City were under the jurisdiction of the English Football Association. Chester City were liquidated a month later by HMRC; in any event, the New Saints were granted a domestic licence by the FAW in April 2010 and remained at Park Hall for 2010–11 season. The New Saints were crowned 2009–10 Welsh Premier League Champions.

The New Saints entered the Champions League in 2010–11. They were drawn against League of Ireland Premier Division Champions Bohemians in the Second Qualifying Round. They lost the first leg 1–0 at Dalymount Park in Dublin on 13 July 2010. However they won the second leg at Park Hall 4–0 and won the tie 4–1 on aggregate, the first ever tie won by the club since their European debut in 1996. Bohemians manager Pat Fenlon later labelled his team's performance as 'disgraceful' and said 'the players let the club, league and country down'. The result was labelled by others as the worst result in Bohemians' 40-year European history. The Saints advanced to play Belgian Pro League Champions and European Giants R.S.C. Anderlecht. The Saints were beaten 3–1 in the home leg played in Wrexham and 3–0 in the away game at the Constant Vanden Stock Stadium in Brussels. The Saints then played CSKA Sofia in the Europa League playoff round but were beaten 5–2 on aggregate. As league runners up during the 2010–11 season the Saints entered the Europa League qualifying rounds in 2011. They beat Belfast club Cliftonville 2–1 on aggregate in the First Round but were eliminated by Danish club FC Midtjylland 8–3 on aggregate in the following round.

On 30 December 2016, The New Saints defeated Cefn Druids 2–0 in the Cymru Premier. This extended their winning run to 27 matches, surpassing the previous record of 26 set by Ajax in the 1970s for the most consecutive club victories by a top-flight team.

Cultural references

"Dancing in the Streets" 
On the Sky Sports football show Soccer Saturday, TNS's name was gently mocked by the programme's main presenter, Jeff Stelling. At the end of the day's classified check, if TNS had won at home, Stelling invariably used his catchphrase "They'll be dancing in the streets of Total Network Solutions tonight!", since updated to "dancing in the streets of the New Saints". Stelling's joke was also occasionally aimed at fellow Welsh side, Airbus UK in 2005–06. Stelling's joke may ultimately derive from the accidental 'they'll be dancing in the streets of Raith', claimed to have been said by football commentator Sam Leitch in the 1960s during a match played by the Kirkcaldy-based Raith Rovers, though the phrase is better known as a stock phrase of rugby commentator Bill McLaren, often stating "they'll be dancing in the streets of ..." and inserting in the name of the winning team.

Other 
TNS are mentioned in the song "This One's for Now" by the band Half Man Half Biscuit on the album Urge for Offal.

Futsal 
The club's Futsal side has also seen success, having been winners of the inaugural FAW Futsal Cup in 2011 and reaching the final in 2012.

Current squad

Out on loan

League history

Notes

History in European competition
As of 26 July 2022

Overall

Matches

Notes
 QR: Qualifying round
 1Q: First qualifying round
 2Q: Second qualifying round
 3Q: Third qualifying round
 PO: Play-off round

Honours 
 Cymru Premier Champions (14; record): 1999–2000, 2004–05, 2005–06, 2006–07, 2009–10, 2011–12, 2012–13, 2013–14, 2014–15, 2015–16, 2016–17, 2017–18, 2018–19, 2021–22
 Welsh Cup Winners (8): 1995–96, 2004–05, 2011–12, 2013–14, 2014–15, 2015–16, 2018–19, 2021–22
 Welsh League Cup Winners (9; record): 1994–95, 2005–06, 2008–09, 2009–10, 2010–11, 2014–15, 2015–16, 2016–17, 2017–18
 FAW Premier Cup Winners (1): 2006–07
 Welsh Intermediate Cup Winners (1): 1992–93
 Cymru Alliance League Winners (1): 1992–93
 Shropshire Senior Cup: 2011–12
 Elizabeth Jaques Charity Cup (lower tier): 2015

as Llansantffraid
 Montgomeryshire Amateur Football League Division One Champions (6): 1968–69, 1969–70, 1982–83, 1986–87, 1991–92, 1992–93
 Montgomeryshire Amateur Football League Division Two Champions (2): 1970–71, 1980–81

Individual stats 
 Highest attendance: 14,563 against Liverpool, 2005
 First progression in European football (4–1) agg -v- Bohemians, 2010

Biggest victories and losses 
 Biggest League of Wales win: 12–0 v. Airbus UK Broughton in November 2019.
 Biggest League of Wales defeat: 0–10 v. Barry Town in 1997

Managers 

  Graham Breeze (1992–1994)
 Ian Clarke (1994–1996)
  Graham Breeze (1996–1997)
  Tony Henry (1997–1998)
  Andy Cale (1998–2000)
  Ken McKenna (1 January 2001 – 13 March 2008)
  Andy Cale (13 March 2008 – 30 June 2010)
  Mike Davies (2010–6 April 2011)
  Carl Darlington (6 April 2011 – December 2014)
  Craig Harrison (December 2014 – 2017)
  Scott Ruscoe (2017–2021)
  Anthony Limbrick (2021–2022)
  Craig Harrison (2022–)

First Team Technical Staff 

Head coach –  Craig Harrison
Assistant manager –  Christian Seargeant  
 First Team coach –  Simon Spender
First Team coach –   Simon Smith
Fitness coach –  Thomas Noon
Sports Therapist –   Phillip Davies
Performance Analyst –  Connor Hindley

See also 
 Football in Shropshire
 List of association football clubs playing in the league of another country

References

External links 
 

 
Football clubs in Wales
Cymru Premier clubs
Expatriated football clubs
Sport in Powys
Football clubs in Shropshire
Association football clubs established in 1959
Oswestry
1959 establishments in Wales
Football clubs in England
Cymru Alliance clubs